Bannister Green Halt railway station was a station in Bannister Green, Essex, England. The station closed in 1952.

References

Further reading

External links
 Bannister Green Halt station on navigable 1946 O. S. map
 

Disused railway stations in Essex
Former Great Eastern Railway stations
Railway stations in Great Britain opened in 1922
Railway stations in Great Britain closed in 1952
Felsted